VRE may refer to:

 Volare Airlines (ICAO code)
 Vancomycin-resistant Enterococcus (vancomycin-resistant enterococci)
 Variable renewable energy – wind and solar, primarily
 Virginia Railway Express - a commuter rail system in Virginia, United States
 Virtual research environment